Celmisia spectabilis is one of the more widespread species in the mountainous areas of New Zealand, where it is commonly known as the cotton daisy.  Belonging to the family Asteraceae, this species has leathery leaves that are ovate to lanceolate or narrowly oblong, and can reach 30 cm long. They have a shiny, green upper surface, with prominent parallel grooves, but their undersides are densely covered in soft, whitish or buff-coloured hairs. The leaf bases overlap and compact to form a stout pseudostem. Plants can form mats up to 2 m across.

The flower stems reach 30 cm tall and are densely covered with white hairs. A showy solitary flower head, 3–5 cm across, is borne at the end of each stem. The numerous ray florets are white and the disc florets yellow.

History
Joseph Hooker described it in 1844, in the first volume of his Flora Antarctica. The specimens he studied were collected by the English botanist John Bidwill in 1839 on Mt Tongariro, on New Zealand's North Island.

Ecology 
Celmisia spectabilis has many pollinators. Some examples include Melangyna novaezelandiae and Leioproctus.

References

External links 
 
  Kew Royal Botanic Gardens

spectabilis
Flora of New Zealand
Plants described in 1844
Taxa named by Joseph Dalton Hooker